The Genocidal Deliverance is an EP by Gnaw Their Tongues, released on October 16, 2008 by At War With False Noise.

Track listing

Personnel
Adapted from The Genocidal Deliverance liner notes.
 Maurice de Jong (as Mories) – vocals, instruments, recording, cover art

Release history

References

External links 
 
 The Genocidal Deliverance at Bandcamp

2008 EPs
Gnaw Their Tongues albums